She-Ra: Princess of Power is an American animated series produced in 1985 by Filmation. A spin-off of Filmation's He-Man and the Masters of the Universe series, She-Ra was aimed primarily at a young female audience to complement He-Man's popularity with young males. Unlike He-Man, which was based on the Masters of the Universe toy line by Mattel, the creation of She-Ra was a collaboration between Filmation and Mattel. The initial group of characters and premise were created by uncredited writers Larry DiTillio and J. Michael Straczynski for Filmation, while the characters introduced later were designed by Mattel. Mattel provided financial backing for the series, as well as an accompanying toy line. The series premiered in 1985 and was ended in 1987, after 2 seasons and 93 episodes.

On March 22, 1985, Filmation released an animated film based on the series titled He-Man and She-Ra: The Secret of the Sword. The film is composed of the first five episodes from the She-Ra television series: "Into Etheria", "Beast Island", "She-Ra Unchained", "Reunions" and "Battle for Bright Moon".

A rebooted series, She-Ra and the Princesses of Power, premiered on Netflix on November 13, 2018, and concluded on May 15, 2020.

Plot

The series follows the adventures of Princess Adora, Prince Adam's (He-Man's) twin sister, who leads a group of freedom fighters known as the Great Rebellion in the fight to free Etheria from the tyrannical rule of Hordak and the Evil Horde. With her Sword of Protection, Adora can transform into She-Ra, just as Prince Adam can transform into He-Man.

Born on the planet Eternia to Queen Marlena and King Randor, Princess Adora is kidnapped at birth by Hordak and taken to Etheria. There she serves as a mind-controlled Horde Force Captain before He-Man rescues her. After reuniting with her parents on Eternia, She-Ra decides to return to Etheria and lead the Great Rebellion.

Main characters

The Great Rebellion

The Evil Horde

Episodes

The first season of the series ran five days a week, like He-Man. The second season aired Saturday mornings. She-Ra ended in 1986, and the character was not mentioned in the two subsequent He-Man animated series.

Cast

Comparison list
Many of the characters/locations/vehicles in the Princess of Power toyline share similarities to the pre-existing Masters of the Universe characters. Comparing She-Ra (left) with He-Man (right):

Characters
Adora/She-Ra = Prince Adam/He-Man
Spirit/Swift Wind = Cringer/Battle Cat
Clawdeen = Panthor
Grizzlor = Beast Man
Hordak = Skeletor
Bow = Man-At-Arms
Sweet Bee = Buzz-Off
Double Trouble = Man-E-Faces
Glimmer = Teela
Sorrowful = Granamyr
Leech = Whiplash
Spinerella = Sy-Klone
Shadow Weaver = Evil-Lyn
Scorpia = Clawful
Madame Razz = Orko
Light Hope = The Sorceress

Elements
"By the power of Grayskull!","I have the power!" = "For the honour of Grayskull!","I am She-ra!"
Etheria = Eternia
The Crystal Castle = Castle Grayskull
The Fright Zone = Snake Mountain 
The Sword of Protection = The Sword of Power

Syndication
Reruns aired on USA Network from September 1988 to September 1989, and on Qubo Night Owl from September 27, 2010, to August 25, 2013. In 2010, Retro TV began airing reruns. Reruns have also aired on Me-TV, as well as Teletoon Retro in Canada.

Toys

The female She-Ra characters were released in the 1980s as part of the Princess of Power toy line, while The Evil Horde were incorporated into Masters of the Universe. In the 2000s, an exclusive She-Ra toy was released for the MOTU 200X line. The later Masters of the Universe Classics toy line features characters from the entire franchise, including new action figures from the She-Ra cartoon series.

Other media
In the DC Comics series Masters of the Universe, the title "Masters of the Universe #8" is a one-shot about She-Ra.

Home releases
The most sought after set by collectors due to its 4X6 collectible art cards and extensive bonus features is the BCI Eclipse LLC (under its Ink & Paint classic animation entertainment brand) (under license from Entertainment Rights) released all 93 episodes of She-Ra: Princess of Power in 3 volumes on DVD (Region 1) in 2006–2007. Each episode on BCI Ink & Paint's DVD releases of She-Ra, Princess of Power was uncut, un-edited, digitally remastered and fully restored for optimum audio and video quality and presented in story continuity order. Each volume contains special features including different 4X6 collectible art cards, documentaries, character profiles, commentaries, retrospective interviews, storyboards, DVD-ROM pdf scripts, trivia, and photo galleries. In 2009, the releases were discontinued when BCI Eclipse ceased operations.

On May 31, 2010, Classic Media announced plans to re-release the series on DVD (Region 1). On September 28, 2010, they released Season 1, Volume 1 as a 2-disc set featuring 20 episodes. On January 24, 2011, Classic Media released She-Ra: The Princess of Power - The Complete Series.

On October 19, 2009, Universal Pictures UK (under license from Classic Media) released Season 1, Volume 1 in the UK, exclusively through retailer HMV. In early 2010, other retailers, such as Amazon.co.uk, also began selling the series as a box set.

Madman Entertainment released the entire series on DVD (Region 4) in Australia, both in 3 volumes (similar to BCI Eclipse releases) and as a complete series set.

Universal Pictures Home Entertainment released all 93 episodes of the original 1985 series of She-Ra: Princess of Power on DVD in Region 1 on October 1, 2019. This release includes "He-Man & She-Ra: The Secret of the Sword" and "He-Man & She-Ra: A Christmas Special".

Reboot

On December 12, 2017, DreamWorks Animation SKG and Netflix announced a new reboot series based on She-Ra was announced within DreamWorks Animation Television. The series is executive produced by award-winning author, ND Stevenson (creator of Nimona and Lumberjanes). On May 18, 2018, new voice actors and the official title were revealed. It was released on November 13, 2018. Unlike most reboots, this reboot shares very little in common with the original series outside of the character names. The reboot series is separate from the continuity of the original Masters of the Universe series, and is noted for exploring themes of gender and LGBTQ representation. This differs from the original series, which subtly explores themes such as racism, sexism, environmental conservation and animal rights.

Live Action series
On September 13, 2021, Amazon announced that a live action She-Ra series is in development with DreamWorks Animation serving as an executive producer as the series will be a new, standalone story and will not be connected to the animated show. It was announced that Nicole Kassell will direct the series.

See also

References

External links

She-Ra: Princess of Power at YouTube
She-Ra: PrincessofPower.co.uk for News and Info
She-Ra: Princess of Power at Hulu

1980s American animated television series
1980s American science fiction television series
1985 American television series debuts
1986 American television series endings
Action figures
American animated television spin-offs
American children's animated action television series
American children's animated space adventure television series
American children's animated science fantasy television series
American children's animated superhero television series
Child abduction in television
Crossover animated television series
English-language television shows
Fiction about mind control
First-run syndicated television programs in the United States
Masters of the Universe television series
Princess of Power
Fiction about rebellions
Superheroes
Animated superheroine television shows
Television shows about rebels
Television series about princesses
Television series by Filmation
Television series by Mattel Creations
Television series by Universal Television
Television series set on fictional planets
Television shows based on Mattel toys
Westinghouse Broadcasting